The history of theology has manifestations in many different cultures and religious traditions.

Terminology and connotations 

Plato used the Greek word theologia (θεολογία) with the meaning "discourse on god" around 380 BC in   Republic, Book ii, Ch. 18. Aristotle (384–322 BC)
divided theoretical philosophy into mathematike, physike and theologike, with the last corresponding roughly to metaphysics, which, for Aristotle, included discourse on the nature of the divine.

In  patristic Greek Christian sources, theologia could refer narrowly to devout and inspired knowledge of, and teaching about, the essential nature of God.

The Latin author Boethius, writing in the early 6th century, used theologia to denote a subdivision of philosophy as a subject of academic study, dealing with the motionless, incorporeal reality (as opposed to physica, which deals with  corporeal, moving realities). Boethius' definition influenced medieval Latin usage.

In the Renaissance, especially with Florentine Platonist apologists of Dante's poetics, the distinction between "poetic theology" ( theologia poetica) and "revealed" or Biblical theology served as a steppingstone for a revival of philosophy as independent of theological authority.

It is in this last sense - theology as an academic discipline involving the basis of rational study of Christian teaching - that the term passed into English in the fourteenth century, although it could also be used in the narrower sense found in Boethius and the Greek patristic authors, to mean rational study of the essential nature of God – a discourse now sometimes called theology proper.

From the 17th century onwards, it also became possible to use the term "theology" to refer to study of religious ideas and teachings that are not specifically Christian (e.g., in the term natural theology which denoted theology based on reasoning from natural facts independent of specifically Christian revelation) or that are specific to another religion.

"Theology" can also now be used in a derived sense to mean "a system of theoretical principles; an (impractical or rigid) ideology".

Theological development

Indian theology

Christian theology 

Christian theology, in scholastics of the Middle Age regarded as "the queen of sciences" first developed on the bases of Judaism and of  Greek thought. Initially concerned with shaping and defining the new faith of the followers of Jesus of Nazareth, theological thinkers moved into issues of establishing  church government and of preserving  doctrinal unity ("orthodoxy") by identifying and condemning  heresies. The definitive establishment of a  canon of scripture became important; and as Christianity moved into a role as a state religion in the 4th century (in  Armenia, in the Roman Empire, and in  Ethiopia), the working out of  relationships with secular authority became important.

The 16th-century Protestant reformation, in the spirit of Renaissance humanism, paid great attention to the study of biblical text, accompanied by outbursts of popular theology in personal  religious fervor
and by the refinement of rigorous systematic theology. The resulting tradition of multiple Christian sects served as a background to  revivals in the 18th and 19th centuries, when some of the old  "heresies" (such as Arianism and other  non-Trinitarian beliefs), once apparently stamped out by the earlier ecclesiastical authorities, received more attention and sometimes became elements in further  schisms.

Recent Christian theological movements include Liberation theology, liberal theology, and  fundamentalism.

Islamic theology

See also
Outline of theology

References

External links 

 "Theology" on Encyclopædia Britannica
 Chattopadhyay, Subhasis. "Reflections on Hindu Theology" in Prabuddha Bharata or Awakened India 120(12):664-672 (2014). ISSN 0032-6178. Edited by Swami Narasimhananda.
 

 History
Theology